Tivetshall St Mary is a village and former civil parish, now in the parish of Tivetshall, in the South Norfolk district in the county of Norfolk, England. On the 1st of April 2019 the parish was merged with Tivetshall St Margaret to form Tivetshall.

The villages name means 'Nook of land'. It has been suggested that the first element may be related to a late northern English dialectical, 'tewhit' meaning 'lapwing'. 'St. Mary' from the church dedication.

Notes

External links

Villages in Norfolk
Former civil parishes in Norfolk
South Norfolk